Bulgaria competed at the 2022 European Athletics Championships in Munich, Germany, between 15 and 21 August 2022

Results

Bulgaria entered the following athletes.

Men
Field events

Women
Road events

Field events

References

External links
European Athletics Championships

2022
Nations at the 2022 European Athletics Championships
European Championships in Athletics